Christophe Pognon (born 11 October 1977, in Cotonou) is a former tennis player from Benin.

Pognon represented his native country at the 2000 Summer Olympics in Sydney, Australia, where he was defeated in the first round by Brazil's Gustavo Kuerten. The right-hander reached his highest singles ATP-ranking on 27 August 2001, when he became World Number 804.

Pognon participated in Davis Cup ties for Benin from 1994–2003, posting a 14–17 record in singles and a 1–1 record in doubles.

External links
 
 
 

Tennis players at the 2000 Summer Olympics
Living people
1977 births
People from Cotonou
Olympic tennis players of Benin
Beninese male tennis players